4-Chlorobutyronitrile is the organic compound with the formula ClCH2CH2CH2CN.  With both chloro and cyano functional groups, it is a bifunctional molecule. It is a colorless liquid.

Synthesis

It is prepared by the reaction of potassium cyanide with 1-bromo-3-chloropropane.

Cyclopropyl cyanide is prepared by reaction of 4-chlorobutyronitrile with sodium amide in liquid ammonia. However an increased yield was reported when the base/solvent mixture was changed to NaOH/DMSO.

Drug Use
4-Chlorobutyronitrile is a precursor to the drugs buflomedil and buspirone.

Precursor

4-Chlorobutyronitrile has been used as a starting material to prepare 2-Phenylpyrrolidine [1006-64-0]. This in turn is a chief precursor to a family of compounds called pyrroloisoquinolines. These are valuable agents in medicinal chemistry that are endowed with BAT subtrate reuptake inhibitor properties, elevating the synaptic concentration of serotonin and/or catecholamines. They therefore have application in the treatment of CNS diseases and eating disorders. A list of all of the known codenamed examples includes the following: JNJ-7925476, McN5652, Mcn-5292, Mcn 5707, McN-5908, McN 4612-z, McN-5558 & McN-5847.

More recently, an alternative synthetic protocol was also reported by Maryanoff.

References 

Nitriles
Organochlorides